The 2010 Canadian Soccer League season (known as the Givova Canadian Soccer League for sponsorship reasons) was the 13th since its establishment where a total of 24 teams from Ontario and Quebec took part in the league. The season began on Saturday May 8, 2010, and ended on October 31. Brantford Galaxy SC won their first championship in their inaugural season with a 3–0 win over Hamilton Croatia in the CSL Championship Final at the Centennial Park Stadium in Toronto on October 31, 2010. The CSL administration restructured the league by combining both the International & National divisions to form the CSL First Division with a single table structure. The regular season title was claimed by the York Region Shooters, while the Serbian White Eagles Res. won their first reserve league championship.

The league was granted full membership in the Canadian Soccer Association allowing the CSL to work closely with the CSA in order to continue creating the developmental system required in the development of Canadian players, referees, coaches, and administrators . The season also witnessed the appointment of Domenic Di Gironimo as the new Commissioner after the resignation of Cary Kaplan at the conclusion of the 2009 season. The commissioner was appointed to the CSA Professional Soccer Committee to further continue the planned expansion of the league to a fully national league with regional divisions under the CSL banner. The league expanded throughout Ontario to include the Brant County, Hamilton, and Halton Region territories. The Montreal Impact ended their affiliation with Trois-Rivières Attak, but entered the Montreal Impact Academy as their academy team becoming the second professional academy club to join the league. The Reserve Division also expanded for the first time beyond the Greater Toronto Area to include 11 reserve teams, and an entry level club Ottawa FC.

The CSL reached a sponsorship agreement with Givova which granted the company the naming rights to the league, and to the CSL Championship. Other major sponsorship's included Days Inns – Canada, and a record broadcasting agreement with Rogers TV, which provided coverage of 45 matches including all playoff games to the provinces of Ontario, New Brunswick and Newfoundland through the Rogers Super Sports Pack.

Changes from 2009 season
 Single table structure.
 Four new expansion clubs: Montreal Impact Academy, Milltown FC, Brantford Galaxy SC and Hamilton Croatia.
 Trois-Rivières Attak ended cooperation with Montreal Impact; they announced that they would take a sabbatical year in 2010 and return for the 2011 season.
 Ottawa FC played as a guest team in the Reserve Division.
 Teams played a balanced schedule of 24 games.

Teams

Results table
All stats as of games played October 9, 2010:

Standings

Playoffs

The postseason format began with a two-leg quarterfinal home and away series, followed by a one-game semifinal for the four surviving teams and a one-game final on Sunday, October 31.

The top four teams had the option to play their first quarterfinal game at home or away and the home venue was awarded to the top seeded teams that advanced to the semifinals. The CSL Championship Final was played at Centennial Stadium in Etobicoke on October 31 and received coverage from Rogers TV.

In the event teams were tied on points in the final league standings, CSL rules  provided for the following tiebreakers in the order listed:
 Total wins in regular season games.
 Head-to-head record based on total points in league games.
 Goal difference in regular season games.
 Goals scored in regular season games.

In the unlikely event teams were still tied, the rules provided for the lowest number of disciplinary points during regular season games and if necessary, by the luck of the draw.

In the quarterfinals, the two-game home and away series was decided by total points and if tied on points, it was to be total goals over the two games. There was to be a two 15-minute periods of extra time and FIFA penalty kicks in each game, if necessary. The semifinal and CSL Championship Final was one game, with two 15-minute periods of extra time and FIFA penalty kicks, if necessary.

Bracket

Quarterfinals

Semifinals

Givova CSL Championship

Goal scorers

CSL Executive Committee and Staff 
The 2010 CSL Executive Committee.

Individual awards 

The annual CSL awards were presented before the CSL Championship final on October 31, 2010. Toronto Croatia and York Region Shooters accumulated the most awards with 2 wins each. The MVP and Golden Boot was presented to Tihomir Maletic, a veteran striker for Toronto Croatia. The Serbian White Eagles established the best defensive record throughout the season, and as a result Milos Kocic, a Toronto FC player on loan was given the Goalkeeper of the Year. The league chose Trinidadian international Rick Titus with the Defender of the Year, after contributing to York Region's regular season title. Tony De Thomasis was awarded the Harry Paul Gauss award for his commitment and allegiance to the league.

London City produced another Rookie of the Year with Thomas Beattie, who later advanced to the S.League. After leading Hamilton Croatia to the CSL Championship final Ron Davidson was named the Coach of the Year. The CSL Referee Committee voted Geoff Gamble for the Referee of the Year., and TFC Academy received their second Fair Play and Respect award.

CSL Reserve League 

The reserve league expanded for the first time beyond the Greater Toronto Area border to include 11 teams. While the division operated as feeder and youth developmental system it also began to serve as entry level division to the First Division for clubs with a limited amount of financial resources. All first division clubs operated a reserve team with the except of Toronto Croatia, London City, and the Montreal Impact Academy. Throughout the regular season Brampton Lions won the regular season title, while the Serbian White Eagles claimed the championship.

Teams

Final standings

Final

Individual awards

References

External links
 Official Canadian Soccer League website

Canadian Soccer League (1998–present) seasons
Canadian Soccer League
2010 in Canadian soccer